The Downriver Residential Historic District is a  historic district in Natchez, Mississippi that was listed on the U.S. National Register of Historic Places in 1999.  The listing included 96 contributing buildings, 57 non-contributing ones, one contributing structure (railroad) and one non-contributing one (oil storage tanks).

It includes Greek Revival, Italianate, Stick/Eastlake, Queen Anne, Colonial Revival, Bungalow/Craftsman, and Post-Modern architecture.
The district includes six already-NRHP-listed properties, including:
Ravenna
Charles Patterson House (1898), at 506 Union Street, South, designed and built by Robert Bost
Ravennaside (c.1900), at 601 Union Street, South
Ravennaside outbuilding, at 601 Union Street, South. 
another Ravennaside outbuilding, at 601 Union Street, South.

The district was the eighth historic district in Natchez to be NRHP-nominated, and the seventh nominated by the Historic Natchez Foundation.  Primarily residential, it had lower priority for historic preservation as it was less immediately threatened by commercial development.

References

External links 

Greek Revival architecture in Mississippi
Italianate architecture in Mississippi
Historic districts in Natchez, Mississippi
Historic districts on the National Register of Historic Places in Mississippi
National Register of Historic Places in Natchez, Mississippi